Secofentanyl is an opioid derivative which is an analogue of fentanyl where the piperidine ring has been cleaved to form an open-chain structure. It is around 40x less potent than fentanyl itself but still 5-6x the potency of morphine in animal tests.

See also 
 Benzylfentanyl
 Homofentanyl
 Diampromide
 Isofentanyl
 Phenampromide

References 

Analgesics
Designer drugs
Opioids